Michael Corbett (October 4, 1942 - January 9, 2003) was a Canadian professional ice hockey right winger who played two playoffs games in the National Hockey League for the Los Angeles Kings during the 1967–68 NHL season.

Early life
Corbett was born in Toronto. After playing junior hockey in the Ontario Hockey Association for the Toronto St. Michael's Majors from 1959 to 1962 and the Toronto Neil McNeil Maroons from 1962 to 1963.

Career 
Corbett made his professional debut with the Sudbury Wolves of the Eastern Professional Hockey League in 1962. His participation in the league however was short-lived as the EPHL folded following the season's conclusion, forcing Corbett to look elsewhere to play. Eventually, he signed with the Rochester Americans of the American Hockey League whilst also splitting the 1963–1964 season with the Denver Invaders of the Western Hockey League.

In 1964, Corbett joined the Tulsa Oilers of the Central Professional Hockey League and spent the entire 1964–1965 season with the team. After that, he split the next season with three different teams, the AHL's Baltimore Clippers, the CPHL's Minnesota Rangers and the WHL's Victoria Maple Leafs during their playoff run. He then had short spells in the AHL with the Providence Reds and the Springfield Indians, playing five games with each team, before joining the Vancouver Canucks of the WHL.

Corbett would play in 70 regular season games for the Canucks, scoring 17 goals and 21 assists, for 38 points. Despite this, the Canucks finished last the standings and missed the playoffs. Following this, the Los Angeles Kings of the National Hockey League offered him a spot in their playoff roster and Corbett played in two games for the Kings during their 1968 Stanley Cup playoff quarter-final against the Minnesota North Stars, which they lost four games to three. Corbett notched up one assist and two penalty minutes in the two games he played.

After his brief NHL run came to an end, Corbett played one more season in the professional minor leagues, splitting the year in the International Hockey League with the Dayton Gems as well as back in the AHL with the Springfield Kings before finishing his career playing senior hockey level in the OHA Senior A League. He played for Galt Hornets, Oakville Oaks, Orillia Terriers and the Brantford Foresters from 1969 to 1974. 

After retiring from playing hockey in 1974, Corbett became an usher at the Air Canada Centre in Toronto, Ontario.

Personal life 
Corbett died of cancer at the age of 60, on January 9, 2003, in Burlington, Ontario and was cremated.

External links

1942 births
2003 deaths
Baltimore Clippers players
Canadian ice hockey forwards
Deaths from cancer in Ontario
Dayton Gems players
Denver Invaders players
Ice hockey people from Toronto
Los Angeles Kings players
Minnesota Rangers players
Providence Reds players
Rochester Americans players
Springfield Kings players
Springfield Indians players
Sudbury Wolves (EPHL) players
Toronto Neil McNeil Maroons players
Toronto St. Michael's Majors players
Tulsa Oilers (1964–1984) players
Vancouver Canucks (WHL) players
Victoria Maple Leafs players
Canadian expatriate ice hockey players in the United States